Malini Daman Sharma (born 5 January 1974) is an Indian model and actress, who has worked in videos like Sawan Mein Lag Gayi Aag, Kya Soorat Hai, Ranjhar, Kitni Akeli and movies like Raaz. For her role in the latter, she received the 2003 Zee Cine Award for Best Female Debut.

She was married to model Priyanshu Chatterjee but they divorced in 2001. Malini Sharma decided to quit the showbiz industry after her debut film Raaz. She signed for Gunaah (2002 film), this time as the lead opposite Dino Morea. The unit was in for a royal scare when two days before shooting, Sharma backed out. She also worked as art director for the two films named ‘Thoda Pyar Thoda Magic’ and ‘ Just Married’.

Television
C.A.T.S. as Tanya
Hum Dono as Piyasha Narang/Amita

Filmography

References

External links
 
 

Female models from Delhi
Actresses in Hindi cinema
Indian film actresses
21st-century Indian actresses
Living people
1974 births
Zee Cine Awards winners